The Ministry of Environment is responsible for government programs associated with environmental protection in the province of Saskatchewan, Canada.

References

External links
Ministry of Environment

Environment
Environmental agencies in Canada
Saskatchewan government ministries and agencies
Environmental organizations based in Saskatchewan
Saskatchewan